Foussballclub Etzella Ettelbréck, abbreviated to either FC Etzella or Etzella Ettelbruck, is a football club, based in Ettelbruck, in north-eastern Luxembourg.

History
In the 2005–06 season, Etzella finished third in the National Division, winning a place in the UEFA Cup first qualifying round, where they lost to Åtvidabergs FF of Sweden 7–0 on aggregate. In 2006–07, the club improved to a second-place finish, this time falling to HJK Helsinki of Finland 3–0 on aggregate in the UEFA Cup first qualifying round. In 2007–08 season, Etzella slipped to fourth place, but returned to European competition. In the first round of the Intertoto Cup, they beat Georgian side Locomotive Tbilisi by drawing 0–0 at home and 2–2 away, advancing to play Saturn Moscow Oblast in the second round.

Timeline
1917: Club founded as FC Etzella Ettelbruck
1940: Club renamed as FV Ettelbrück during the German occupation
1944: Original name FC Etzella Ettelbruck restored
1971: First season in National Division
1981: Moved to current stadium, Stade Am Deich
2001: Winners of Luxembourg Cup
2001: First participation in European competition (season 2001–02)
2005, 2007: Finished second in the National Division
2008: Won first round tie in Intertoto Cup

Honours
National Division
Runners-up (2): 2004-05, 2006–07

Luxembourg Cup
Winners (1): 2000–01
Runners-up (3): 2002–03, 2003–04, 2018–19

European competition
FC Etzella have qualified for UEFA European competition seven times.

UEFA Cup
Qualifying round (6): 2001–02, 2003–04, 2004–05, 2005–06, 2006–07, 2007–08

Intertoto Cup
Second round: 2008

Overall, Etzella's record in European competition reads:

Current squad
As of 5 February, 2023.

Former coaches
 Luc Holtz (July 1, 1998 – June 30, 2008)
 Florim Aliaj (July 1, 2008 – Oct 1, 2008)
 Alvaro da Cruz (Oct 2, 2008 – June 30, 2009)
 Benny Reiter (July 1, 2009 – June 30, 2010)
 Gauthier Remacle (July 1, 2010 – April 11, 2011)
 Eddie Rob (caretaker) (April 12, 2011 – June 30, 2011)
 Patrick Grettnich (July 1, 2011 – June 30, 2013)
 Klaus-Peter Wagner (July 1, 2013–)

Former Chairmen
 Jean-Pierre Gauthier

External links
 FC Etzella official website

Football clubs in Luxembourg
Ettelbruck
Association football clubs established in 1917
1917 establishments in Luxembourg